The 2017–18 Zenit Saint Petersburg season was the 93rd season in the club's history and its 22nd consecutive season in the Russian Premier League.

Season Events
Prior to the start of the season, 1 June 2017, Roberto Mancini replaced Mircea Lucescu as manager of Zenit.

Squad

Out on loan

Transfers

Summer

In:

Out:

Winter

In:

Out:

Competitions

Russian Premier League

Results by round

Results

League table

Russian Cup

UEFA Europa League

Qualifying rounds

Group stage

Knockout phase

Squad Statistics

Appearances and goals

|-
|colspan="14"|Players away from the club on loan:

|-
|colspan="14"|Players who left Zenit St.Petersburg during the season:

|}

Goalscorers

Disciplinary record

References

FC Zenit Saint Petersburg seasons
Zenit Saint Petersburg
Zenit St.Petersburg